Streptomyces europaeiscabiei or is a streptomycete bacterium species that is associated with common scab in potatoes. Its type strain is CFBP 4497T.

References

Further reading

Whitman, William B., et al., eds. Bergey's manual® of systematic bacteriology. Vol. 5. Springer, 2012.

External links

Type strain of Streptomyces europaeiscabiei at BacDive -  the Bacterial Diversity Metadatabase

europaeiscabiei